The Best in the World Pack is the third extended play by Canadian rapper Drake. It was released on June 15, 2019, by Frozen Moments, Republic Records and OVO Sound. It contains the dual singles "Omertà" and "Money in the Grave", with the latter featuring a guest appearance from American rapper Rick Ross, and later becoming Drake's 26th and Ross' 2nd number one respectively, on Billboards Rhythmic Songs chart in August 2019. Multiple publications noted that the EP marks Drake's first release outside of the Cash Money Records and Young Money Records record labels. Instead, on streaming services, the release lists "2019 Frozen Moments, LLC, under exclusive licensing to Republic Records, a division of UMG Recordings, Inc". Billboard confirmed that Frozen Moments has previously been listed on additional OVO projects.

Background
Drake posted the cover of both songs on his social media on June 14, 2019. After the NBA Championship win of the Toronto Raptors, the songs served as a "celebration release". Drake was named Global Ambassador of the team and was previously seen attending the 2019 NBA Finals.

Track listing
Credits adapted from Tidal.

Personnel
Credits adapted from Tidal.

 40 – mixing 
 Harley Arsenault – mixing assistant 
 Greg Moffet – mixing assistant 
 Les "Bates" Bateman – engineering 
 Lindsay Warner – engineering

Charts

"Omertà"

"Money in the Grave"

Weekly charts

Year-end charts

Certifications

"Money in the Grave"

References

2019 EPs
Drake (musician) EPs
Young Money Entertainment albums
Cash Money Records EPs
Republic Records EPs